Knallerfrauen (Eng: Fire-women) is a German sketch comedy series first aired in 2011. The series stars actress Martina Hill in the main role. The sketches are unrelated and frequently depict absurd situations, often without any dialog. The jokes are similar in part to the French sketch comedy series Vous les femmes.

Knallerfrauen was so popular in China that a Chinese version was produced.

Content
Martina Hill plays herself in various scenes of everyday life. The humor usually arises from the contrast of its occurrence and the more anarchic everyday reactions of the other protagonists.

Cast

Awards
2012: Bambi Awards: Comedy
2012: German Comedy Award: Best Sketch Comedy

References

External links
 

German comedy television series